Robert Newman Flock (April 16, 1918 – May 16, 1964) was an American stock car racer. He qualified on the pole position for NASCAR's first Strictly Stock (now NASCAR Cup Series) race and, along with Red Byron, is considered one of the two best drivers from that era. Flock died of a heart attack in 1964.

Flock family
He was the brother of NASCAR pioneers Tim Flock and Fonty Flock, and the second female NASCAR driver Ethel Mobley. The four raced at the July 10, 1949 race at the Daytona Beach Road Course, which was the first event to feature a brother and a sister, and the only NASCAR event to feature four siblings. Ethel beat Fonty and Bob by finishing in eleventh.

Moonshine business
The Flock family had an illegal moonshine business. The federal agents discovered that Flock would be running a race in Atlanta, and they staked out the place to make an arrest. A gate opened as the race was beginning, and he drove on the track to take the green flag. The police vehicles quickly appeared on the track. They chased Flock for a lap or two before he drove through the fence. The police followed him until he ran out of gas. Reminiscing years later, Flock said, "I would have won that race if the cops had stayed out of it."

Racing career
He was a well-established driver before NASCAR was formed. He took over NASCAR founder Bill France's ride in 1946. He won both events at the Daytona Beach Road Course in 1947.  Flock was known for his daring driving style.  For example, during a race on June 15, 1947, Flock overturned his car in an accident.  Instead of accepting a DNF, he solicited help from spectators, who turned the car back on its wheels, and he finished the race: "Like other wrecks it wasn’t anywhere near as serious, and folks flipped Flock’s car over on its wheels." In an October 1947 race at Piedmont Interstate Fairgrounds, he suffered a crushed vertebra when his tire blew, sending his car through the track fencing and into a light pole.

He sat on the pole for NASCAR's first race at Charlotte Speedway on June 19, 1949, setting a qualifying time of 38.37 seconds. He had two wins that season, and finished third in the points behind Lee Petty and champion Red Byron.

Flock was the only winner of a Cup Series race held at the mysterious Air Base Speedway in Greenville, SC in 1951 on August 25. His brothers, Tim and Fonty also took part in the event. The track was closed in 1952 after only three years of racing but was still visible by 1964 and only partially by 1976.

He won two 100 lap ARCA races at Lakewood Speedway in 1954.

Flock retired from driving when he broke his back in an on-track accident. He had over 200 modified wins in his career.

He competed in one NASCAR Convertible Division event, at Montgomery Motor Speedway, he started on pole position but finished 20th after having a broken axle.

Track promoter
Flock became a track promoter in Atlanta. He hired three women (Sara Christian, and Mildred Williams, and his sister Ethel Mobley) to race at his new track.

Awards
He was inducted in the Georgia Automobile Racing Hall of Fame in 2003.
He was a member of the National Motorsports Hall of Fame Association.

Motorsports career results

NASCAR
(key) (Bold – Pole position awarded by qualifying time. Italics – Pole position earned by points standings or practice time. * – Most laps led. ** – All laps led.)

Grand National Series

Convertible Division

References

External links
 
Georgia Automobile Racing Hall of Fame
1949 season recap at NASCAR.com
Flock family website - includes photos (mainly of Fonty)

1918 births
1964 deaths
NASCAR drivers
People from Fort Payne, Alabama
Racing drivers from Alabama
ARCA Menards Series drivers
Flock family